Portsmouth by-election may refer to one of two by-elections held for the British House of Commons constituency of Portsmouth:

 1900 Portsmouth by-election
 1916 Portsmouth by-election